The First Three Minutes: A Modern View of the Origin of the Universe (1977; second edition 1993) is a book by American physicist and Nobel Laureate Steven Weinberg.

Summary 

The First Three Minutes attempts to explain the early stages of the universe after the Big Bang.
 Weinberg begins by recounting a creation myth from the Younger Edda and goes on to explain how, in the first half of the twentieth century, cosmologists have come to know something of the real history of the universe. He gives us a brief history of cosmology, informing us that "It seems to have been Immanuel Kant who first proposed that some of the nebulae 'or rather a species of them' are galaxies like our own." This issue was resolved by Edwin Hubble, whose observations of Cepheid variables in Andromeda showed it was too far away to be part of the Milky Way: "the Andromeda Nebula, and the thousands of similar nebula, are galaxies like our own, filling the universe to great distances in all directions."  Early in the book, Weinberg explores the origins and implications of the Hubble constant, that the red shift of galaxies is proportional to their distance, and how this is evidence for the expansion of the Universe. He introduces the Cosmological Principle, that the universe is isotropic and homogeneous. He then tells the story behind the discovery of the cosmic microwave background by Arno Penzias and Robert Wilson in 1965. After giving the reader a basis of understanding of astrophysics and particle physics, in chapter 5, Weinberg lays out the makeup of the Universe after its origin in a series of frozen frames. Weinberg shows how the Big Bang can account for the relative abundance of Hydrogen and Helium in the universe. Late in the book, Weinberg discusses the future of cosmology and possible unification of physics. Weinberg concludes by writing that science gives meaning to human existence: "Men and women are not content to comfort themselves with tales of gods and giants, or to confine their thoughts to the daily affairs of life; they also build telescopes and satellites and accelerators, and sit at their desks for endless hours working out the meaning of the data they gather. The effort to understand the universe is one of the very few things that lifts human life a little above the level of farce, and gives it some of the grace of tragedy." The origin of the universe has moved out of the realm of myth and into the field of scientific study. 

In the introduction, Weinberg explains his views on writing about physics for the nonspecialist: “When a lawyer writes for the public, he assumes that they do not know Law French or the Rule Against Perpetuities, but he does not think the worse of them for that, and he does not condescend to them… I picture the reader as a smart old attorney, who does not speak my language, but who expects nonetheless to hear some convincing arguments before he makes up his mind.” The book contains a glossary and a "mathematical supplement" for readers who want to understand the mathematics behind the physics.

In the second edition, Weinberg includes "an afterword about developments in cosmology since the book's publication in 1977." In particular, he discusses the recent results from the Cosmic Background Explorer satellite, which provided further evidence for the Big Bang. He also discusses more speculative ideas like inflationary cosmology.

Reception 
In The New York Review of Books, Martin Gardner praised The First Three Minutes as "science writing at its best." In The New Yorker, Jeremy Bernstein wrote that "Weinberg builds such a convincing case...that one comes away from his book feeling not only that the idea of an original cosmic explosion is not crazy but that any other theory is scientifically irrational." In the acknowledgments of the first edition of A Brief History of Time, Stephen Hawking writes that prior to his book "There were already a considerable number of books about the early universe and black holes, ranging from the very good, such as Steven Weinberg's book, The First Three Minutes, to the very bad, which I will not identify." In 1995, the physicist Paul Davies wrote a book for the Science Masters series titled The Last Three Minutes, about the possible fate of the universe. After Weinberg's passing, Scientific American mentioned his "most famous (or perhaps infamous) statement can be found on the second-to-last page of his first popular book, The First Three Minutes": "The more the universe seems comprehensible, the more it also seems pointless."

See also 
 A Brief History of Time by Stephen Hawking
 The Inflationary Universe by Alan Guth
 Big Bang: The Origin of the Universe by Simon Singh

References 

1977 non-fiction books
American non-fiction books
Basic Books books
Books by Steven Weinberg
Cosmology books
English-language books
Popular physics books